Unser Gedank was a Bundist Yiddish-language newspaper published fortnightly from Buenos Aires. At its height in the early 1960s, it had a circulation of around 2,000. Editors included Alexander Minc, M. Bernstein and M. Perec.

References

Anti-Zionism in South America
Ashkenazi Jewish culture in Argentina
Bundism
Defunct newspapers published in Argentina
European-Argentine culture in Buenos Aires
Jews and Judaism in Buenos Aires
Mass media in Buenos Aires
Secular Jewish culture in South America
Yiddish culture in South America
Yiddish periodicals
Publications with year of disestablishment missing
Publications with year of establishment missing